Adbhuta Ramayana is a Śāktaḥ Sanskrit work. It is considerably more obscure than both the Valmiki Ramayana—generally considered the original version—as well as Tulsidas’ Awadhi version entitled Ramacharitamanasa, northern India's most popular version of the Ramayana story.

Scholarly analysis of its content and text history has, to this point, been minor. Its significance lies in its traditional place in the body of Ramayana literature. It is not to be confused with the Kannada prose work of the same name by Nandalike Lakshminarayana.

The Adbhuta Ramayana is composed in 27 sargas of various metres, and only briefly recounts the traditional Rama narrative. The earliest episodes of Rama's life, as depicted in Valmiki’s original telling—such as the story of Rama's birth, his training with Vishwamitra, and the breaking of Shiva’s bow at Sita’s swayamvara—are omitted. This adaptation of Rama's life begins with his confrontation with Parashurama as he and his family returned from his wedding in Janakpura. The story glosses over other noteworthy events of the epic, focusing more on supportive stories intended to elaborate upon the major themes of Valmiki's primary work.

Sita is accorded far more prominence in this variant of the Ramayana narrative, and indeed two of its most notable contributions are an elaboration of the events surrounding her birth—in this case to Ravana’s wife, Mandodari—as well as her conquest of Ravana's older brother in the form of Mahakali.

Summary
Sarga 1: The Rishi Bharadwaja approached Valmiki and asked him to narrate the story of Rama, reminding him that the Ramayana includes hundreds of thousands of shlokas (verses), most of which have been unavailable. Bharadwaja asked to hear one of those secret stories, to which Valmiki agreed, noting that this version would emphasize the deeds of Sita, the incarnation of Prakriti (nature). Valmiki emphasized, however, that Rama was the manifestation of the supreme, and that ultimately there is no distinction between Rama and Sita—they are one.

Sarga 2: Parabrahmana, the supreme lord of entire Universe and beyond  has three forms. Brahmaa, Vishnu and Rudra (Shiva). All three are actually same and Vishnu can take Rudra form with the help of Tamas guna (Lakshmi can take Mahakali form as well). King Ambarisha was a great devotee of Vishnu, and one day Vishnu offered him a boon. Ambarisha asked that he always remain absorbed in the supreme bliss of Vishnu, vowing in return that he would defend all of Vishnu's devotees. Lord Vishnu was pleased and granted the boon, promising that his divine discus would always protect the king.

Sarga 3: Ambarisha had a daughter named Shrimati (she was an avatar of Lakshmi, who later took the form of Sita), beautiful and famous for her virtues and good qualities. The sages Narada and Parvata each desired her for a wife (they did not know Shrimati's true form), and so Ambarisha—unable to choose one and incur the wrath of the other—arranged her swayamvara, so that she could decide who should be her husband. Narada and Parvata then independently approached Lord Vishnu, asking that the other be unknowingly appear in the disguise of a monkey, which only Shrimati could see. Lord Vishnu agreed to both, and the two sages proceeded to Shrimati's swayamvara.

Sarga 4: Narada and Parvata attended the swayamvara, both appearing to Shrimati as monkeys, but each imagining himself handsome and irresistible. Lord Vishnu then disguised himself as a human, sitting between them. Shrimati saw the monkey-faced sages before her but of course did not recognize them as Narada and Parvata, and so was surprised when there was no sign of either sage. And so she chose the handsome youth between the two monkey-faced men.

Narada and Parvata then realized what Vishnu had done, and cursed him to be born on earth as a human, and to roam the forests searching for his wife—Shrimati reborn, who would be abducted by an evil being. Lord Vishnu accepted, saying that he would be born as Rama, the son of Dasharatha. Also, in Rama avatar, he would be forgotten about his divinity, his omnipotence and his infinite powers. However, around true devotees, like Parashurama (another avatar of Lord), Hanuman (avatar of lord Shiva) Rama the avatar of Vishnu might remember his true form temporarily.

Sarga 5: The Sage Kaushika became famous for his devotional songs, glorifying the greatness of Lord Vishnu. His reputation spread far and wide, and many devotees from every caste became his disciple. His fame spread to the king of Kalinga, who demanded that Kaushika sing devotional songs to him rather than to Vishnu. Kaushika insisted that he could only praise Vishnu, and his disciples held that they could only listen to praises of Vishnu. The king became angry, took away their property, and banished them from the kingdom. When the end of their lives finally arrived, they departed to the world of Brahma(with long a, Brahmaa the creator), who took them to Vishnu-loka, the abode of Vishnu, where they lived eternally.

Sarga 6: Vishnu once organized a great festival in honour of Kaushika, featuring many beautiful songs. Millions of celestial maidens attended, as well as Lakshmi, the consort of Vishnu, with her retinue of maid servants. When the featured singer Tumburu was accorded great honour and praise, Narada was offended; and when one of Lakshmi’s maids slighted Narada, he cursed Lakshmi to be born on earth in the form of a rakshasi (demoness). When Narada's anger subsided he became remorseful, and soon thereafter Vishnu and Lakshmi came to assuage his sorrow. Vishnu recommended to Narada that if he wanted to be accorded the same respect as Tumburu, he should study singing with the great Uluka (a being with the form of an Owl) known as Ganabandhu, a master of devotional singing.

Sarga 7: This sarga outlines the basic rules of expert singing. Narada had learned the skill of singing, and imagining himself an expert he proceeded to the abode of Tumburu to better him. At Tumburu's home he was confronted by a collection of beings with mutilated bodies, who explained that they were the embodiments of the musical notes that had been mutilated by Narada's inept singing. Narada realized that he was the victim of his own inflated pride, and sought Vishnu's advice.

Vishnu suggested that he wander as a gandharva celestial musician singing the praises of the Lord until the time of Vishnu's incarnation as Krishna. At that time he should remind Vishnu (as Krishna) of the incident. When Vishnu came to earth as Lord Krishna and was reminded, he sent Narada to various experts until his command of music was almost perfected. Then Krishna himself taught him the best forms of devotional music and song.

Sarga 8: Ravana performed great tapas (austerities) to please Brahmaa, the creator. When Brahmaa granted him a boon, he requested eternal life, but Brahmaa indicated that this was not possible. Ravana then asked that he be invulnerable to the devatas, rakshasas, yakshas, and many other celestial beings; but he did not include humans in the list as they were, in his view, of no consequence. He also asked that he perish should he make advances toward his own daughter.

Emboldened by Brahmaa's boon, Ravana began his attempts to conquer the three worlds, but his reckless behavior set in motion the events leading to the birth of Sita from his wife Mandodari.
 
The sarga ends with Janaka’s discovery of Sita in a field while preparing the ground for his yagya.

Sarga 9: The re-telling of the traditional story of Rama begins with Rama's confrontation with Parashurama, while he was returning to Ayodhya from his marriage to Sita. Parashurama had heard that Rama had broken Shiva’s bow (Pinaka), and had come to test him. After strong words between them, Rama strung an arrow on Parashurama's bow, and while shooting it in the direction of Parashurama, he showed his cosmic form as the supreme being. At that moment, the earth shook with great peals of thunder, and flashes of lightning lit the sky. Parashurama, recognizing that Rama was indeed the incarnation of Vishnu, bowed to him and returned to Mt. Mahendra to perform tapas.

Sarga 10: The story moves quickly forward to Sita's abduction by Ravana, following Rama's exile into the dandaka forest. Upon meeting Hanuman, Rama briefly showed him his cosmic form as Vishnu, with Lakshmi. Lakshmana revealed his form as Shesa, the cobra upon whom Vishnu rests, Shesa is a form of Lord Hari Vishnu himself and also known as Shankarshana; and in turn Hanuman revealed his true nature, though the text does not elaborate upon his true nature. However, it can be guessed that Hanuman showed the form of Lord Rudra or Shiva.

Sarga 11: Rama (temporarily remembered his true form) reveals to Hanuman the fundamental tenets of Yoga and Samkhya philosophies, emphasizing their fundamental unity. In his discussion of Atma, which must be understood through the path of jnana as well as experienced through yoga, Rama revealed his own identity with Atma.

Sarga 12: Rama continues his philosophical discourse.

Sarga 13: Rama continues his discourse, identifying himself with that entity of which he has been speaking—that from which the entire creation emerges.
 
Sarga 14: Rama continues speaking to Hanuman about himself as the progenitor of creation, and all that is, was, and will be.

Sarga 15: Hanuman, meditating upon the form of Rama in his heart, expressed his devotion to Rama as atma, purusha, hiranyagarbha, the source of all creation, and then bowed to him.

Sarga 16: In twenty verses, we see Rama explaining his need to find Ravana and Sita, his departure to Lanka, his conquest of Ravana, and his triumphant return to Ayodhya.

Sarga 17: In the court of Ayodhya, in the presence of saints and seers, Sita noted that the slaying of Ravana was not that big a deal. When she was very young living in her father's home in Janakpura, a Brahmin had passed through and told her of Ravana's older brother, names Sahastra Ravana, two thousand armed and thousand headed, living on an island named Pushkara, he was originally much more powerful than his younger brother. However, since Ten headed Ravana had Brahmaa’s boon and Shiva's blessings, so Ten headed Ravana had tormented and almost ruled the Universe while Sahastra Ravana started to live in Pushkara. After the death of Ten headed Ravana, Sahastra Ravana was needed to be stopped. Or else Sahastra Ravana could destroy the Earth in the absence of Ten headed Ravana.

Sarga 18: Rama collected his army of monkeys, men, and rakshasas, and departed to conquer Sahastra Ravana. Sahastra Ravana was surprised to see Rama's army deployed against him, but quickly assembled his hordes of rakshasas. This sarga describes the rakshasa army commanders and their weapons in detail.

Sarga 19: A continuation, enumerating the participants in the forthcoming battle.

Sarga 20: The battle begins, a closely fought encounter in which the monkeys gain the upper hand.

Sarga 21: Sahastra Ravana, seeing Rama's army on the verge of victory, decided to participate. Employing the vayavastra weapon, he dispersed Rama's army to the places from which they came: the men to Ayodhya, monkeys to Kishkindha, and the rakshasas to Lanka. Rama was angry, and prepared to engage Sahastra Ravana.

Sarga 22: In their first one-on-one encounter, a fierce and unrelenting battle, Rama employed the Brahmastra, given to him by Agastya. Sahastra Ravana grabbed it with his hand and snapped it in two as though it were straw, dismaying Rama. Rama was overconfident that he could beat Sahastra Ravana very easily, but it was not so easy and Rama became absent minded. Taking the advantage of absent minded Rama, Sahastra Ravana then shot his own arrow at Rama, rendering him unconscious and bringing widespread consternation.

Sarga 23: Seeing Rama unconscious and helpless on the field, Sita laughed, and giving up her human appearance she took on the exceedingly horrific form of Mahakali. In less than a second, she severed Sahastra Ravana's 1000 heads and began destroying rakshasas everywhere. Innumerable mothers of every type came to the battlefield to sport with Mahakali, playing games with the heads of rakshasas. The earth shook and almost sank into the netherworlds, but was rescued by Shiva disguised as a corpse.

Sarga 24: Realizing that the earth might be destroyed if Sita as Mahakali did not calm down, the Devatas came to appease her. They exclaimed that only through shakti does the supreme lord become accessible. She pointed to the unconscious Rama, making clear that because he was unconscious she could not consider the world's welfare. Brahmaa restored Rama's consciousness, but as he regained awareness he was frightened of Sita's horrific form. Brahmaa explained to Rama that she had taken this form to highlight the fact that everything he does—the creation and destruction of the universe, and all other activities can only be accomplished in association with her, with shakti. Rama was satisfied, and his fears allayed.

Sarga 25: Brahmaa assured Rama that the horrific form before him was indeed Sita, and so he asked her who she really was. She explained that she was the entity within everyone, known as Shiva (with a long a, the shakti of Lord Shiva), who can take one across the ocean of sansara. She then gave Rama “celestial sight” so that he could perceive her divine state (due to Narada and Parvata's curse, Rama forgot that he was the supreme God and thus Sahastra Ravana could make him unconscious and he needed celestial sight to see Sita's divine form). Seeing her true nature, he was thrilled, and praised her by reciting her 1008 names.

Sarga 26: Rama continued to praise her, and at his request she reverted to her form as Sita. They then prepared to return to Ayodhya.

Sarga 27: Rama and Sita mounted the car known as pushpaka, and soon arrived in Ayodhya. Once there, he narrated the story of the elder Ravana's defeat to everyone. They then bade farewell to Sugriva and his army of monkeys as well as to Vibhishana and his army of rakshasas. The sarga concludes with a brief re-counting of Rama's story and an ennumeration of the merits and benefits of hearing the story of the Adbhuta Ramayana (also known as the Adbhutottara Kandam).

References 

Works based on the Ramayana
Hindu texts
Sanskrit texts
Epic poems in Sanskrit